The 2011 AIHL season is the 12th season of the Australian Ice Hockey League (AIHL). It ran from 14 April 2011 until 28 August 2011, with the Goodall Cup finals following on 3 and 4 September. The Melbourne Ice won the H Newman Ried trophy after finishing first in the regular season standings with 65 points. The Ice also won the Goodall Cup final series after defeating the Newcastle North Stars in the final.

Teams
In 2011 the AIHL had 8 teams competing in the league.

League business
During the off-season the Australian Ice Hockey League (AIHL) announced two new teams would be joining the league. The Mustangs IHC were announced to become the eighth team in the AIHL starting in the 2011 season. The Mustangs are based at Docklands, Victoria, the home of the Melbourne Ice. The ninth team, Perth Thunder, were accepted into the league as a provisional member. The Thunder will play exhibition games against other AIHL teams during the 2011 season in order to gain the vote to be accepted for the 2012 season. At the Annual General Meeting it was proposed to increase the length of the games periods from 15 minutes to 20 minutes to be inline with International Ice Hockey Federation rules however the proposal was unsuccessful due to reasons such as costs to the teams and the ability to fill the four lines with AIHL-level players.

On 10 July the game between the Gold Coast Blue Tongues and the Sydney Ice Dogs was cancelled due to an unsafe surface at the Blue Tongues home venue, Bundall Iceland. The AIHL deemed that the Blue Tongues have forfeited the game against the Ice Dogs 5–0, with the Ice Dogs being awarded the full three points.

From 20 to 21 August the Australia men's national ice hockey team will field a team at the 2011 New Zealand Winter Games so only two games will be held for that weekend.

Player transfers

Exhibition games
Prior to the regular season, the Sydney Bears hosted an exhibition All-Star event and match at the Penrith Ice Palace. The All Star Classic had the Bears Veterans (over 35's) face off against the Rookies (Under 35s). The Rookies team won the All Star Classic 9–5.

During the season three teams competed against the AIHL's provisional member, Perth Thunder, in order for the Thunder to gain entry into the league for the following season. In May the Thunder travelled to Adelaide to compete in two games against the Adelaide Adrenaline. They drew the first game 2–2 and won the second 3–0. In June the Melbourne Ice travelled to Perth to compete in two games against the Thunder at the Cockburn Ice Arena. The Ice won the first game 4–3 and lost the second game 3–6 after letting in six goals to none in the final period. In September the Newcastle North Stars traveled to Perth to play the Thunder in a two-game series. The Thunder won both the first and second game 4–2.

Regular season
The Melbourne Ice won the H Newman Reid Trophy after finishing first in the regular season standings with 65 points. Last years winners, the Newcastle North Stars finished second with 59 points. Jason Baclig of the Melbourne Ice was named the 2011 AIHL MVP edging out the Gold Coast Blue Tongues' Matt Amado and Sydney Ice Dogs' Matt Monaghan.

April

May

June

July

 I Game was forfeited due to poor ice conditions.

August

Standings

Source

Statistics

Scoring leaders
List shows the ten top skaters sorted by points, then goals.

Leading goaltenders
Only the top five goaltenders, based on save percentage with a minimum of ten games played.

Goodall Cup playoffs
The 2011 Finals weekend started on 3 September 2011, with the Goodall Cup final being held on 4 September 2011. Following the end of the regular season the top four teams advanced to the playoff series. Melbourne Ice who finished first in the standings was drawn against the Adelaide Adrenaline who finished fourth in the first semi-final match, while the second semi-final was played between the second and third ranked teams, Newcastle North Stars and Sydney Ice Dogs. The series was a single game elimination with the two winning semi-finalists advancing to the Goodall Cup final. All three games were held at the National Ice Sports Centre (Icehouse) in Melbourne, Victoria. The Melbourne Ice went back-to-back and won the Goodall Cup for the second year in a row after defeating the Newcastle North Stars in the final 3–2. Australian forward, Joseph Hughes, of the Melbourne Ice was named the finals MVP after the final.

All times are UTC+10:00

Semi-finals

Final

References

External links
The Australian Ice Hockey League

2011 in ice hockey
2011 in Australian sport
2011